Oliver Emil Haupt Jr. (February 28, 1892 - February 17, 1984)  was an American figure skater. He was the 1934 Novice Men's Champion, 1935 Junior Pair Champion with Jeanne Schulte, 1938 U.S. Men's Bronze Medalist, 1939 & 1940 U.S. Men's Silver Medalist and a 1940 Olympic Team Member. He represented the St. Louis Skating Club.  He was described by Popular Mechanics in 1940 as "one of America's outstanding figure skaters".

References

American male pair skaters
American male single skaters
1890s births
1984 deaths